Linda Marsh (born Linda Cracovaner; February 8, 1939) is an American actress of film, stage, and television. She was nominated for a Golden Globe Award for her performance in Elia Kazan's 1963 film America, America.

Early years
Marsh was born in New York City to Arthur Cracovaner, a physician, and Liska March, a former Ziegfeld dancer. She chose Marsh as her stage last name because the actors' union already had a Linda March as a member.

Marsh attended a private school in New York and Bennington College. She left Bennington after two years to pursue  a career in acting.

Career
Marsh became one of the actresses who were regularly romanced by the stars of TV series, including The Man From U.N.C.L.E. (S3E21, "The It's All Greek to Me Affair", 1967 Feb 03); I Spy; The Wild Wild West (S1E14, "The Night of the Howling Light", 1965 Dec 17); Mannix (S1E4, "The Many Deaths of Saint Christopher", 1967 October 7; It Takes a Thief (S1E11, "To Steal a Battleship", 1968 March 26); Hawaii Five-O (S02E07, "Sweet Terror," 1969 Nov 05; S03E07, "Forces of Waves," 1970 Oct 28; S12E06, "Image of Fear," 1979 Nov 08); and Daniel Boone (S6E19, "A Matter of Vengeance", 1970).

Among her early television appearances, she played Elizabeth Bacio, daughter of the title character, in the 1965 Perry Mason episode "The Case of the Sad Sicilian."  In 1968, she had a major role playing Rachel in S1E8 of the TV series "Here Come the Brides."  She also appeared as Nora in The Big Valley (S4E16, "The 25 Graves of Midas," February 3, 1969).

Marsh portrayed Susan Shelby Magoffin, the first woman to travel the Santa Fe Trail, in the 1965 episode "No Place for a Lady" on the syndicated television anthology series, Death Valley Days.

Marsh underwent a series of rhinoplasties following her early successes rather than changing her appearance before starting her career. She had more glamorous parts in the later 1960s. She was a frequent guest star on television into the 1970s, with her last credited roles in 1979.

Marsh's few film appearances included Che! (1969), Homebodies (1974) and Freebie and the Bean (1974). She had a supporting role in the television miniseries The Dark Secret of Harvest Home (1978).

Marsh won acclaim in Elia Kazan's film adaptation of his book America, America, playing a young woman who is betrothed to the story's ambitious main character but is abandoned in his quest to emigrate from Turkey to the United States. To play the characters in the epic film, which was loosely based on his uncle's life, the director said he chose actors who were Jewish (naming Marsh among them) or Greek because "all of them know oppression, they all have uncles from the 'Old World' and have an affectionate relationship towards their forebears."

In 1964 she played Ophelia in John Gielgud's celebrated Broadway production of Hamlet starring Richard Burton. Her Ophelia received mixed notices, but Gielgud liked her performance and resisted efforts to recast the part despite holding more auditions during rehearsals.

Personal life
On April 3, 1966, Marsh married actor Richard Sinatra in Beverly Hills, California.

Filmography

References

External links 
 
 
 Linda Marsh at Internet Off-Broadway Database

1939 births
American film actresses
American television actresses
Actresses from New York City
Jewish American actresses
Living people
20th-century American actresses
21st-century American Jews
21st-century American women